In the Beginning is a 2009 French drama film directed by Xavier Giannoli. The film competed in the main competition at the 62nd Cannes Film Festival.

Plot
The film tells the dramatized true story of Philippe Berre, a Frenchman with a reputation as an impostor. In the film, much as actual events, Monsieur Berre goes to a small town, passing himself off as a civil engineer, and claims that the government has decided to start previously scrapped plans for the construction of a highway. He commissions supplies, gains construction vehicles, and brings jobs to the community and actually constructs a section of roadway in the process before being discovered.

Cast

 François Cluzet as Paul / Philippe Miller
 Emmanuelle Devos as Stéphane
 Brice Fournier as Louis	
 Soko as Monika
 Vincent Rottiers as Nicolas
 Gérard Depardieu as Abel
 Corinne Masiero as Corinne
 Patrick Descamps as Bollard
 Thierry Godard as Michel

References

External links

2009 films
2009 drama films
French drama films
2000s French-language films
Films directed by Xavier Giannoli
Films scored by Cliff Martinez
Films about con artists
Drama films based on actual events
2000s French films